Aleksei Shvalev (born 25 May 1987) is a Russian professional ice hockey player who played with HPK in the SM-liiga during the 2010-11 season.

References

External links

1987 births
HPK players
Living people
Russian ice hockey defencemen
Ice hockey people from Saint Petersburg